Plus grandir is the fourth compilation album by French singer Mylène Farmer, released on 20 August 2021 on the Polydor Records. The album debuted on the first place in the French Albums Chart.

Track listing

Charts

Weekly charts

Year-end charts

Certifications

References

2021 compilation albums
Mylène Farmer compilation albums
Polydor Records compilation albums
French-language compilation albums